Captain Jack's is a full-service restaurant in the Disneyland Park at Disneyland Resort Paris. It is based on Disneyland's Blue Bayou Restaurant.

Although seated in a large, enclosed structure, diners experience an illusion that mimics being located on a Caribbean beach in an outdoor restaurant at nighttime. This effect is achieved through the use of a dark ceiling and special lighting, as well as sound and visual effects.  Diners hear the chirping of crickets and croaking of frogs and they see the glow of fireflies.  The restaurant is very closely tied to the Pirates of the Caribbean attraction, in that the water stream that runs by the diners in the restaurant carries the attraction's boats as visitors begin their ride. Diners and riders are often in visual contact.

In 2017 the restaurant was renamed Captain Jack's from its previous name, The Blue Lagoon.

References

External links

Captain Jack's — Disneyland Paris

Disneyland Park (Paris)
Restaurants in France
Film-themed restaurants
Walt Disney Parks and Resorts restaurants
Restaurants established in 1992
Pirates of the Caribbean